The following is a list of events relating to television in Ireland from 2021.

The Late Late Toy Show broadcast on 26 November was the most watched programme on Irish television in 2021.

Debuts
7 January – Clear History on RTÉ2 
7 March – Smother on RTÉ1
10 April – Home Advantage on RTÉ1
11 April – Keys to my Life on RTÉ1
12 September - Kin

Ongoing television programmes

1960s
 RTÉ News: Nine O'Clock (1961–present)
 RTÉ News: Six One (1962–present)
 The Late Late Show (1962–present)

1970s
 The Late Late Toy Show (1975–present)
 The Sunday Game (1979–present)

1980s
 Fair City (1989–present)
 RTÉ News: One O'Clock (1989–present)

1990s
 Would You Believe (1990s–present)
 Winning Streak (1990–present)
 Prime Time (1992–present)
 Nuacht RTÉ (1995–present)
 Nuacht TG4 (1996–present)
 Reeling In the Years (1999–present)
 Ros na Rún (1996–present)
 TV3 News (1998–present)
 Ireland AM (1999–present)
 Telly Bingo (1999–present)

2000s
 Nationwide (2000–present)
 TV3 News at 5.30 (2001–present) – now known as the 5.30
 Against the Head (2003–present)
 news2day (2003–present)
 Other Voices (2003–present)
 The Week in Politics (2006–present)
 At Your Service (2008–present)
 Operation Transformation (2008–present)
 3e News (2009–present)
 Two Tube (2009–present)

2010s
 Jack Taylor (2010–present)
 Mrs. Brown's Boys (2011–present)
 MasterChef Ireland (2011–present)
 Today (2012–present)
 The Works (2012–present)
 Celebrity MasterChef Ireland (2013–present)
 Second Captains Live (2013–present)
 Ireland's Fittest Family (2014–present)
 Claire Byrne Live (2015–present)
 The Restaurant (2015–present)
 Red Rock (2015–present)
 TV3 News at 8 (2015–present)
 First Dates (2016–present)
 The Tommy Tiernan Show (2017–present)
 Striking Out (2017–present)

2020s
 The Style Counsellors (2020–present)

Deaths
 8 February – Rynagh O'Grady, 69, actress (Abbey Theatre, Father Ted'').
 10 April - Shay Healy, 78, broadcaster, journalist and songwriter, Parkinson's disease.

See also
2021 in Ireland

References